The following outline is provided as an overview of and topical guide to Quebec:

Quebec, a  province in the eastern part of Canada, lies between Hudson Bay and the  Gulf of St. Lawrence.  It is the only Canadian province with a predominantly  French-speaking population and the only one whose sole official language is French at the provincial level.  Sovereignty plays a large role in the politics of Quebec, and the official opposition social-democratic Parti Québécois advocates national sovereignty for the province and  secession from Canada.  Sovereigntist governments held referendums on independence in 1980 and in 1995; voters rejected both proposals - the latter by a very narrow margin. In 2006 the House of Commons of Canada passed a  symbolic motion recognizing the "Québécois as a nation within a united Canada."

General reference 
 Pronunciation:  or 
 Common English name(s): Quebec
 Official English name(s): Quebec
 Nickname: "La Belle Province" (French for "The Beautiful Province")
 Common endonym(s):  
 Official endonym(s):  
 Adjectival(s): Quebec/Québécois
 Demonym(s): Quebecker/Quebecer/Québécois

Geography of Quebec 

Geography of Quebec

 Quebec is: a province of Canada.
 Canada is: a country
 Population of Quebec: 7,970,672 (est.)
 Area of Quebec: 1,542,056 km2 (595,391 sq. miles)
 List of Quebec area codes
 Atlas of Quebec

Location 
 Quebec is situated within the following regions:
 Northern Hemisphere, Western Hemisphere
 Americas
 North America
 Northern America
 Laurentia
 Canada
 Central Canada
 Eastern Canada
 Canadian Shield
 Time zones (see also Time in Canada):
 Eastern Standard Time (UTC−05), Eastern Daylight Time (UTC−04)  – includes most of the province
 west of the Natashquan River
 west of the 63°W longitude
 Atlantic Standard Time (UTC−04), Atlantic Daylight Time (UTC−03)
 east of the Natashquan River
 east of the 63°W longitude
 Magdalen Islands
 Extreme points of Quebec
 Landforms of Quebec

Environment of Quebec 

Environment of Quebec

 Climate of Quebec
 Ecology of Quebec
 Ecoregions in Quebec
 Renewable energy in Quebec
 Geology of Quebec
 Protected areas of Quebec
 Biosphere reserves in Quebec
 National parks in Quebec
 Wildlife of Quebec
 Flora of Quebec
 Fauna of Quebec
 Birds of Quebec
 Mammals of Quebec

Natural geographic features of Quebec 

List of landforms of Quebec
 Fjords of Quebec
 Glaciers of Quebec
 Islands of Quebec
 Lakes of Quebec
 Lake Mistassini
 Lake Albanel
 Lac Saint-Jean
 Champlain Lake
 Clearwater Lakes
 Richmond Gulf (off.: lac Guillaume-Delisle)
 Meech Lake
 Lake Mégantic
 Lake of Two Mountains
 Lake Saint-Louis
 List of dams and reservoirs in Quebec
 Caniapiscau Reservoir
 Robert-Bourassa Reservoir
 Pipmuacan Reservoir
 Manicouagan Reservoir
 Dozois Reservoir
 Gouin Reservoir
 Rivers of Quebec
 Saint Lawrence River
 Chaudière River
 Jacques-Cartier River
 Manicouagan River
 Ottawa River
 Rivière aux Outardes
 Rivière des Prairies
 Richelieu River
 Romaine River
 Saguenay River
 Saint-François River
 Saint-Maurice River
 Koksoak River
 Caniapiscau River
 La Grande River
 Sakami River
 Eastmain River
 Rupert River
 Laforge River
 Great Whale River
 Nottaway River
 Broadback River
 Waterfalls of Quebec
 Mountains of Quebec
 List of mountain ranges of Quebec
 Laurentides
 Appalaches
 Monts Chic-Chocs
 Collines Montérégiennes
 Monts Torngat
 Volcanoes in Quebec
 Valleys of Quebec

Heritage sites in Quebec 
 World Heritage Sites in Quebec (2)
 Miguasha National Park
 Old Quebec
National Historic Sites of Canada in Quebec
Répertoire du patrimoine culturel du Québec

Regions of Quebec 

Regions of Quebec

Ecoregions of Quebec 

List of ecoregions in Quebec
 Ecoregions in Quebec
 Atlantic Maritime Ecozone (CEC)
 Mixedwood Plains Ecozone (CEC)
 Northern Arctic Ecozone (CEC)
 Northwest Atlantic Marine Ecozone (CEC)
 Southern Arctic Ecozone (CEC)
 Taiga Shield Ecozone (CEC)

Administrative divisions of Quebec 

Administrative divisions of Quebec

Regions of Quebec 

Regions of Quebec

 Bas-Saint-Laurent
 Saguenay–Lac-Saint-Jean
 Capitale-Nationale
 Mauricie
 Estrie
 Montreal
 Outaouais
 Abitibi-Témiscamingue
 Côte-Nord
 Nord-du-Québec
 Gaspésie–Îles-de-la-Madeleine
 Chaudière-Appalaches
 Laval
 Lanaudière
 Laurentides
 Montérégie
 Centre-du-Québec

Indian reserves in Quebec 
 List of Indian reserves in Quebec

Municipalities of Quebec 

List of municipalities in Quebec
 Population centres in Quebec
 Quebec City – Windsor Corridor
 Municipal reorganization in Quebec
 Types of municipalities in Quebec
 Metropolitan communities in Quebec
 Communauté métropolitaine de Montréal
 Communauté métropolitaine de Québec
 Municipalities by type
 Cities of Quebec
 Urban agglomerations of Quebec
 Capital of Quebec: Quebec City – the only city in North America with extant city walls.
 Geography of Quebec City
 Upper town located on the Cap-Diamant
 Climate of Quebec City
 Demographics of Quebec City
 Architecture of Quebec City
 List of historic buildings in Quebec City
 List of tallest buildings in Quebec City
 Boroughs of Quebec City
 List of hospitals in Quebec City
 List of events in Quebec City
 History of Quebec City
 List of mayors of Quebec City
 Timeline of Quebec City history
 Transport in Quebec City
 Name of Quebec City
 List of people from Quebec City
 Ramparts of Quebec City
 Symbols of Quebec City
 Coat of arms of Quebec City
 Flag of Quebec City
 Montreal
 Geography of Montreal
 Located on the Island of Montreal
 Climate of Montreal
 Demographics of Montreal
 Places in Montreal
 Areas of Montreal
 Boroughs of Montreal
 List of neighbourhoods in Montreal
 List of public art in Montreal
 List of hospitals in Montreal
 Landmarks of Montreal
 List of parks in Montreal
 List of baseball parks in Montreal
 Urban agglomeration of Montreal
 Culture of Montreal
 Architecture of Montreal
 List of oldest buildings and structures in Montreal
 List of tallest buildings in Montreal
 List of people from Montreal
 Symbols of Montreal
 Coat of arms of Montreal
 Flag of Montreal
 Economy of Montreal
 History of Montreal
 Timeline of Montreal history
 Name of Montreal
 Reorganization of Montreal
 Mayor of Montreal
 Past Mayors
 Politics of Montreal
 Municipal government of Montreal
 Proposal for the Province of Montreal
 Transport in Montreal
 List of airports in the Montreal area
 List of Montreal bus routes
 List of Montreal Metro stations
 Port of Montreal
 List of roads in Montreal
 List of township municipalities in Quebec
 List of united township municipalities in Quebec
 Communauté métropolitaine de Québec
 List of communities in Quebec
 List of Anglo-Quebecer communities
 List of parish municipalities in Quebec
 List of regional county municipalities and equivalent territories in Quebec
 List of village municipalities in Quebec
 List of boroughs in Quebec

Demography of Quebec 

Demographics of Quebec
 Demographic history of Quebec
 Language demographics of Quebec
 List of Anglo-Quebecer communities

Population distribution by religion

Government and politics of Quebec 

Politics of Quebec
 Form of government:
 Capital of Quebec: Quebec City
 Anti-Quebec sentiment
 Elections in Quebec (last 5)
 2014 Quebec general election
 2012 Quebec general election
 2008 Quebec general election
 2007 Quebec general election
 2003 Quebec general election
 Quebec autonomism
 Quebec federalist ideology
 Quebec nationalism
 Quebec sovereignty movement
 List of subjects related to the Quebec independence movement
 Act Respecting the Future of Quebec
 History of the Quebec sovereignty movement
 Québécois nation motion
 Reference re Secession of Quebec
 Partition of Quebec
 Political parties in Quebec
 Political scandals of Quebec
 Taxation in Quebec

Branches of the government of Quebec 

Government of Quebec

Executive branch of the government of Quebec 
 Head of state: King in Right of Quebec, King of Canada, King Charles III
 Head of state's representative (Viceroy): Lieutenant Governor of Quebec, J. Michel Doyon
 Previous lieutenant governors
 Head of government: Premier of Quebec, Jean Charest
 Previous premiers
 Deputy Premier of Quebec
 Previous Deputy Premiers
 Cabinet: Executive Council of Quebec
 Head of council: Lieutenant Governor in Council, as representative of the King in Right of Quebec
 Leader of the government in parliament
 Departments of the Quebec Government
 Secrétariat aux affaires intergouvernementales canadiennes (Ministry of Intergovernmental Affairs)
 Secrétariat aux affaires autochtones (Ministry of Aboriginal Affairs)
 Ministry of Agriculture, Fisheries and Food
 Ministry of Municipal Affairs, Regions and Land Occupancy
 Ministry of Culture and Communications
 Ministry of Economic Development, Innovation and Export Trade
 Ministry of Education, Recreation and Sports
 Finances Québec
 Revenu Québec
 Ministère des Services gouvernementaux (Ministry of Government Services)
 Secrétariat du Conseil du trésor (Treasury Board)
 Ministry of Health and Social Services
 Ministry of Immigration and Cultural Communities
 Ministry of International Relations
 Ministry of Justice
 Ministry of Labour
 Ministry of Native Affairs
 Ministry of Natural Resources and Wildlife
 Ministry of Public Security
 Ministry of Seniors' Affairs
 Ministry of Sustainable Development, Environment and Parks
 Ministry of Tourism
 Transports Québec (Ministry of Transport)
 Ministry of Youth Protection and Rehabilitation

Legislative branch of the government of Quebec 

 Parliament of Quebec (unicameral): National Assembly of Quebec
 President of the National Assembly of Quebec: Yvon Vallières
 Parliament Building
 Federal representation
 Quebec lieutenant
 List of Quebec senators

Judicial branch of the government of Quebec 

Federal Courts of Canada
 Supreme Court of Canada
 Federal Court of Appeal
 Tax Court of Canada
 Canadian court of appeal: Quebec Court of Appeal
 Superior court: Quebec Superior Court
 Provincial Court: Court of Quebec
 The Civil Division
 The Criminal and Penal Division
 The Youth Division
 Military court: Court Martial Appeal Court of Canada

International relations of Quebec 

 Ministry of International Relations
 Quebec Government Offices

Law and order in Quebec 

Law of Quebec
 Bar of Quebec –  the provincial  law society  for lawyer s in Quebec (officially known by its French designation: Barreau du Québec)
 Capital punishment in Quebec: none.
 Quebec, as with all of Canada, does not have capital punishment.
 Canada eliminated the death penalty for murder on July 14, 1976.
 Civil Code of Quebec – composed of ten books:
 Persons
 The Family
 Successions
 Property
 Obligations
 Prior Claims and Hypothecs
 Evidence
 Prescription
 Publication of Rights
 Private International Law
 Constitution of Quebec
 Criminal justice system of Quebec
 Crime in Quebec
 Organized crime in Quebec
 Human rights in Quebec
 Quebec Charter of Human Rights and Freedoms
 Charter of the French Language
 Civil unions in Quebec
 High Arctic relocation (human rights violation)
 Legal dispute over Quebec's language policy
 LGBT rights in Quebec
 Same-sex marriage in Quebec
 Law enforcement in Quebec
 Penal system of Quebec

Military of Quebec 

Canadian Forces
Being a part of Canada, Quebec does not have its own military.  The Canadian forces stationed within Quebec are detailed below:

Land forces in Quebec 
 Land Forces in Quebec
 Regular Forces
 Infantry Regiment (HQ based in Quebec City)
 1st Battalion, Royal 22nd Regiment Mechanized Infantry (based in  Canadian Forces Base Valcartier)
 2nd Battalion, Royal 22nd Regiment Mechanized Infantry (based in Quebec City)
 3rd Battalion, Royal 22nd Regiment Light infantry (based in CFB Valcartier)
 Armoured Regiment (based in CFB Valcartier)
 Mechanized Brigade Group (based in CFB Valcartier)
 Headquarters & Signal Squadron : 5 CMBG Headquarters & Signal Squadron (based in CFB Valcartier)
 Artillery : 5e Régiment d'artillerie légère du Canada (based in CFB Valcartier)
 Engineer Regiment (based in CFB Valcartier)
 Military Research (based in CFB Valcartier)
 5 Area Construction Troop, 4 Engineer Support Regiment (based in Courcelette - QC)
 Regular Forces Support Group
 5 Area Support Group5 Area Support Group (based in Canadian Forces Base Montreal)
 5 Service Battalion (based in CFB Valcartier)
 5 Area Support Group Signal Squadron (based in CFB Montreal)
 CFB/ASU Unit Montreal (based in CFB Montreal)
 CFB/ASU Valcartier (based in CFB Valcartier)
 ASU Saint-Jean Richelain
 5 Military Police Unit (based in CFB Montreal)
 5 Military Police Platoon (based in CFB Valcartier)
 5 Field Ambulance (based in CFB Valcartier)
 Reserve
 34e Groupe-Brigade du Canada (Reserve) (entirely based in CFB Montreal)  which includes:
  Royal Canadian Hussars (Montreal) (Reserve) (Armoured - Cougar)
 The Canadian Grenadier Guards (Reserve) (Light Infantry)
 The Black Watch (Royal Highland Regiment) of Canada (Reserve) (Light Infantry)
 The Royal Montreal Regiment (Reserve) (Light Infantry)
 Le Régiment de Maisonneuve (Reserve) (Light Infantry)
 Les Fusiliers Mont-Royal (Reserve) (Light Infantry)
 35 Canadian Brigade Group Headquarters (Quebec City)
 Sherbrooke Hussars, Reconnaissance (Sherbrooke)
 12e Régiment blindé du Canada (Milice), Reconnaissance (Trois-Rivières)
 Le Régiment de la Chaudière, Light Infantry (Lévis)
 Le Régiment du Saguenay, Light Infantry (Chicoutimi)
 Les Fusiliers de Sherbrooke, Light Infantry (Sherbrooke)
 Les Fusiliers du St-Laurent, Light Infantry (Rimouski)
 Les Voltigeurs de Québec, Light Infantry (Quebec City)
 6e Régiment d'artillerie de campagne, ARC Artillery (Lévis)
 62e Régiment d'artillerie de campagne, ARC Artillery (Shawinigan)
 35 Combat Engineer Regiment, Engineer (Quebec City)
 35 (Quebec) Service Battalion, Service and Support (Quebec City)

Air forces in Quebec 
 Air Forces in Quebec
 Regular Forces
 403 Helicopter Operational Training Squadron (based in Canadian Forces Base Valcartier)
 425 Tactical Fighter Squadron (based in Canadian Forces Base Bagotville)
 439 Combat Support Squadron (based in Canadian Forces Base Bagotville)

Naval forces in Quebec 
 Naval Forces in Quebec at the Naval Reserve Headquarters (NAVRESHQ)

Local government in Quebec 

Local government in Quebec

History of Quebec

History of Quebec, by period 
 Hochelaga (village)
 New France
 Articles of Capitulation of Quebec
 Articles of Capitulation of Montreal
 French and Indian War
 Province of Quebec (1763–1791)
 Invasion of Canada (1775)
 Lower Canada
 Rebellions of 1837
 Canada East
 Burning of the Parliament Buildings in Montreal
 Quebec during World War II
 See Military history of Canada during World War II
 Quebec Conference, 1943
 Conscription Crisis of 1944
 Second Quebec Conference
 Quiet Revolution (1960s)
 Expo 67
 Front de libération du Québec
 October Crisis (1970)
 1980 Quebec referendum
 Meech Lake Accord (1987)
 Oka Crisis (1990)
 1995 Quebec referendum
 Unity Rally (1995)
 North American ice storm of 1998
 Quebec Biker war

History of Quebec, by region 

 History of Montreal
 Timeline of Montreal history
 History of Quebec City
 Timeline of Quebec City history

History of Quebec, by subject 
 Demographic history of Quebec
 Economic history of Quebec
 History of Quebec French
 Municipal history of Quebec
 History of the Quebec sovereignty movement

Culture of Quebec 

Culture of Quebec
 Architecture of Quebec
 Architecture of Quebec City
 Citadelle of Quebec
 Habitat 67
 List of Quebec architects
 Cuisine of Quebec
 Quebec beer
 List of breweries in Quebec
 Quebec wine
 Provincial decorations and medals (in order of precedence)
 Grand Officer of the National Order of Quebec
 Officer of the National Order of Quebec
 Knight of the National Order of Quebec
 Festivals in Quebec
 Montreal International Jazz Festival
 Festival d'été de Québec
 Quebec Winter Carnival
 Montreal World Film Festival
 Humour in Quebec
 Just for Laughs
List of Quebec comedians
 Language demographics of Quebec (see also: language section in Quebec article)
 Quebec English
 Quebec French
 History of Quebec French
 Quebec French lexicon
 Quebec French phonology
 Quebec French profanity
 Quebec French syntax
 Media in Quebec
 Museums in Quebec
 Order of precedence in Quebec
 Prostitution in Quebec
 Public holidays in Quebec
 Records of Quebec
 Regional culture in Quebec (culture by region)
 Culture of Montreal
 Scouting and Guiding in Quebec

Art in Quebec 
 Art in Quebec
 Quebec comics
 Cinema of Quebec
 List of Quebec actors
 List of Quebec film directors
 List of Quebec films
 Comedy of Quebec
 List of Quebec comedians
 Dance of Quebec
 Literature of Quebec
 Quebec comics
 List of Quebec writers
 Music of Quebec
 List of musicians from Quebec
 List of Quebec record labels
 Television in Quebec
 List of Quebec television series
 Theatre in Quebec
 List of Quebec actors
 Grand Théâtre de Québec

People of Quebec 

 Quebec diaspora
 Ethnicities in Quebec
 Aboriginal peoples in Quebec
 English Canadian
 English-speaking Quebecer
 French Canadian
 French-speaking Quebecer
 Irish Quebecers
 Scots-Quebecers
 List of Quebecers
 List of English-speaking Quebecers
 Lists of people from Quebec by region

Religion in Quebec 

Religion in Quebec
 Buddhism in Quebec
 Christianity in Quebec
 Anglicanism in Quebec
 Anglican Diocese of Quebec
 Roman Catholicism in Quebec
 Roman Catholic Archdiocese of Quebec
Chicoutimi
Sainte-Anne-de-la-Pocatière
Trois Rivières
 Roman Catholic Archdiocese of Montréal
 Roman Catholic Diocese of Joliette
 Roman Catholic Diocese of Saint-Jean-Longueuil
 Roman Catholic Diocese of Saint-Jérôme
 Roman Catholic Diocese of Valleyfield
 Ursulines of Quebec
 Hinduism in Quebec
 Islam in Quebec
 Judaism in Quebec
 Sikhism in Quebec
 Irreligion in Quebec

Sports in Quebec 

 Curling in Quebec
 List of curling clubs in Quebec
 Baseball in Quebec
Québec Capitales (Canadian-American Association of Professional Baseball)
 Football in Quebec
Montreal Alouettes (Canadian Football League)
CF Montreal (Major League Soccer)
 Ice Hockey in Quebec
 List of ice hockey teams in Quebec
Montreal Canadiens (National Hockey League)
Quebec Remparts  (Minor Hockey League)
 Rugby Quebec
 Major sporting events
 1976 Summer Olympics
 Canadian Grand Prix

Quebec Athletes
Notable Quebec athletes include:
Baseball : Éric Gagné, Russell Martin, Dick Lines
Basketball : Bill Wennington, Samuel Dalembert, Joel Anthony
Cycling : Geneviève Jeanson, Lyne Bessette
Diving : Alexandre Despatie, Sylvie Bernier, Annie Pelletier
Figure skating : Joannie Rochette, Isabelle Brasseur, David Pelletier, Josée Chouinard, Valérie Marcoux
Hockey : Maurice Richard, Guy Lafleur,  Mario Lemieux, Mike Bossy, Jean Béliveau, Patrick Roy, Martin Brodeur, Vincent Lecavalier, Doug Harvey, Roberto Luongo, Joe Malone
Judo : Nicolas Gill
Taekwondo : Trần Triệu Quân
Mixed martial arts : Georges "Rush" St-Pierre
Short-track speed skating : Marc Gagnon, Nathalie Lambert, Éric Bédard
Long track speed skating : Gaétan Boucher
Racing : Gilles Villeneuve, Jacques Villeneuve, Alex Tagliani, Patrick Carpentier
Football : Paul Lambert, Éric Lapointe, Terry Evanshen, Ian Beckles
Soccer : Nick DeSantis, Sandro Grande, Adam Braz, Patrick Leduc

Symbols of Quebec 

Symbols of Quebec
 Coat of arms of Quebec
 Flag of Quebec
 National anthem of Quebec (unofficial): Gens du pays
 Provincial flower: blue flag iris
 Provincial bird: snowy owl
 Provincial tree: yellow birch
 Provincial motto: Je me souviens (I remember)
 Provincial symbol: Fleur-de-lis
 Provincial capital: Quebec City

Economy and infrastructure of Quebec 

Economy of Quebec
 Economic rank (by nominal GDP) - This ranking shows only the Rank of Canada, the country in which is located Quebec
 Agriculture in Quebec
 List of breweries in Quebec
 Banking in Quebec
 Desjardins Group
 National Bank of Canada
 Laurentian Bank of Canada
 Royal Bank of Canada
 Bank of Montreal
 CIBC
 Communications in Quebec
 Internet in Quebec
 Radio stations in Quebec
 Television in Quebec
 Television stations in Quebec
 TVA (Canadian TV network)
 V (TV network)
 Ici Radio-Canada Télé
 Télé-Québec
 Companies of Quebec
 Currency of Quebec - Quebec is a province and therefore shares its currency with the country in which it is located, Canada.
 Economic history of Quebec
 Energy in Quebec
 Environmental and energy policy of Quebec
 Oil industry in Quebec
 Electricity sector in Quebec
 Electrical generating stations in Quebec
 Hydroelectric generating stations in Quebec
 Wind farms in Quebec
 Biomass generating stations in Quebec
 Nuclear generating stations in Quebec
 Fossil fuel generating stations in Quebec
 Generating stations serving loads not connected to the main North American power grid in Quebec
 Hydro-Québec
 Hydro-Québec's electricity transmission system
 James Bay Project
 Health care in Quebec
 List of hospitals in Quebec
 Mining in Quebec
 Montreal Stock Exchange
 Tourism in Quebec
 Transport in Quebec
 Air transport in Quebec
 Airlines of Quebec
 Airports in Quebec
 Rail transport in Quebec
 Railways in Quebec
 Roads in Quebec
 Autoroutes of Quebec
 Vehicle registration plates of Quebec
 Water supply and sanitation in Quebec

Education in Quebec 

Education in Quebec
The Quebec education system is unique in North America in that it has 4 education levels: grade school, high school, college, university.

 Primary education in Quebec
 School districts in Quebec
 English educational institutions in Quebec
 Grade school in Quebec
 High school in Quebec
 Higher education in Quebec
 College education in Quebec
 Public colleges in Quebec
 Private subsidized colleges in Quebec
 Private colleges under licence in Quebec
 Government colleges in Quebec
 Art schools in Quebec
 Universities in Quebec
 Francophone universities
 Université Laval
 Université de Montréal and its affiliated schools
 École Polytechnique de Montréal
 HEC Montréal
 Université de Sherbrooke
 Université du Québec
 École nationale d'administration publique
 Institut national de la recherche scientifique
 École de technologie supérieure
 Université du Québec à Chicoutimi
 Université du Québec à Montréal
 Université du Québec à Rimouski
 Université du Québec à Trois-Rivières
 Université du Québec en Abitibi-Témiscamingue
 Université du Québec en Outaouais
Anglophone universities
 Bishop's University
 Concordia University
 McGill University

See also 

 Index of Quebec-related articles
 Outline of geography
 Outline of North America
 Outline of Canada
 Outline of Alberta
 Outline of British Columbia
 Outline of Manitoba
 Outline of Nova Scotia
 Outline of Ontario
 Outline of Prince Edward Island
 Outline of Saskatchewan

References

External links 

Government of Quebec
 
Discover the Quebec in pictures, photos
Bonjour Québec, Quebec government official tourist site
Bill 101
CBC Digital Archives – Quebec Elections: 1960–1998
Agora, online encyclopaedia from Quebec 
An article on the province of Quebec from The Canadian Encyclopedia

History
Quebec History, online encyclopaedia made by Marianopolis College
The 1837–1838 Rebellion in Lower Canada, Images from the McCord Museum's collections
Haldimand Collection, documents in relation with Province of Quebec during the American War of Independence (1775–1784)

Quebec
Quebec
 1